Aalt Toersen (born 6 November 1945 in Staphorst, Overijssel) is a Dutch former professional Grand Prix motorcycle road racer. 

He had his best years in 1969 and 1970 when he won three races and finished the season in second place in the 50cc world championship, both times behind Angel Nieto.

References 

1945 births
Living people
People from Staphorst
Dutch motorcycle racers
50cc World Championship riders
125cc World Championship riders
Sportspeople from Overijssel
20th-century Dutch people